Amelia Hazard (born 22 October 2000) is an English footballer who plays as a midfielder for the FA Women's Championship club Lewes.

Club career

Milton Keynes Dons 
Hazard came through Milton Keynes Dons youth system, going into the senior team during the 2016–17 season while the team was playing in the FA Women's Premier League South East Division One.

Arsenal 
In February 2018, Hazard signed with the FA Women's Super League team Arsenal. She made her debut for the club as a substitute on 2 December 2018 in a 2–0 defeat to fellow title challengers Manchester City and made her first start three days later in a 5–0 victory over Charlton Athletic in the League Cup.

London Bees 
In August 2019, Hazard joined FA Women's Championship club London Bees.

International career 
Hazard has been capped by England at several youth levels. In March 2019, Hazard was called up to the England under-19 team during 2019 UEFA Women's Under-19 Championship qualification, playing in a 7–0 win over Turkey. She received her first call up for an under-21 training camp in October 2019.

Career statistics

Club 
.

References

External links 
 
 

Living people
2000 births
English women's footballers
Arsenal W.F.C. players
London Bees players
Women's Super League players
FA Women's National League players
Women's association football midfielders
England women's under-21 international footballers
Lewes F.C. Women players